The Bowers–Felts House on Lotus Lane in Lufkin, Texas was designed by architect Shirley Simons and was built c. 1928–1937.  It was listed on the National Register of Historic Places in 1988.

It is a two-story masonry Tudor Revival-style house that is felt to be one of the best examples of Shirley Simons' works in that style.

It is one of several Tudor Revival buildings designed by Simons in Lufkin;  other NRHP-listed ones are the C. W. Perry Archie–Hallmark House, the A. F. Perry and Myrtle–Pitmann House, and the Houston Brookshire–Yeates House (1920).

See also

National Register of Historic Places listings in Angelina County, Texas

References

Houses on the National Register of Historic Places in Texas
Tudor Revival architecture in Texas
Houses completed in 1937
Houses in Angelina County, Texas
Lufkin, Texas
National Register of Historic Places in Angelina County, Texas